Anastasios "Tasos" Tsokanis (born 2 May 1991) is a Greek professional footballer who plays as a defensive midfielder or left back for Super League club Volos, for which he is captain.

Career
Tsokanis started his career at Iraklis Psachna in 2009 and during his time there, the club won two consecutive promotions in three years, from the Delta Ethniki to the Football League. Until his contract was terminated in 2012, he made a total of 43 appearances and scored 8 goals for the club in the Football League and Football League 2.

In July 2012, he signed a two-year contract with Kerkyra in the Greek Superleague. He made his debut at the league's opening match against Atromitos, coming as a substitute for Anestis Agritis in the 61st minute.

On 27 May 2014, he signed a three years' contract with Asteras Tripolis for an undisclosed fee.

On 7 June 2019, he joined Volos, signing a two-year contract, on a free transfer.

References

External links

1991 births
Living people
Footballers from Chalcis
Greek footballers
Association football midfielders
Iraklis Psachna F.C. players
A.O. Kerkyra players
Apollon Smyrnis F.C. players
Asteras Tripolis F.C. players
Panetolikos F.C. players
Volos N.F.C. players
Delta Ethniki players
Gamma Ethniki players
Football League (Greece) players
Super League Greece players